Madhuca cuprea is a species of plant in the family Sapotaceae. It is a tree endemic to Peninsular Malaysia. The species is confined to rainforest in Perak. There is not enough information to determine whether it is endangered.

References

cuprea
Endemic flora of Peninsular Malaysia
Trees of Peninsular Malaysia
Data deficient plants
Taxonomy articles created by Polbot